Göynüyən (also, Gëyniyan) is a village in the Goranboy Rayon of Azerbaijan.  The village forms part of the municipality of Hazırəhmədli.

References 

Populated places in Goranboy District